"Kicking and Screaming" is a song by Welsh post-hardcore band Funeral for a Friend, the song was released as the second single from their fourth album, Memory and Humanity, released on 28 September 2008. A video for the single directed by Nicholas (Nick) Bartleet and cinematographed by Eric Maddison made its debut on 9 August 2008. The song is Funeral for a Friend's lowest ever charting single, debuting at #116 in the UK, when all other singles reached the top 40, although Rules and Games failed to even make the top 200 in 2009. Unlike most of the other songs on the album, Kicking and Screaming is leaned towards a much more alternative rock sound.

Track listing

CD
"Kicking and Screaming" - 3:25
"Constant Illuminations" - 2:56
"Faster" - 3:54

Vinyl
"Kicking and Screaming"
"Join Us" - 3:48

Download bundle
"Kicking and Screaming"
"Faster"
"Join Us"
"Kicking and Screaming" (Demo) - 3:30
"Kicking and Screaming" (Ghostlines remix) - 3:49

Charts

References

Funeral for a Friend songs
2008 singles
Wikipedia requested audio of songs
2008 songs
Roadrunner Records singles